Day Job is the fourth studio album by Canadian country music artist Gord Bamford. It was released on April 6, 2010, by Royalty Records. Its first single was the title track.

Track listing

Chart performance

Singles

References

External links
[ Day Job] at Allmusic

2010 albums
Gord Bamford albums
Royalty Records albums
Albums produced by Byron Hill
Canadian Country Music Association Album of the Year albums